Nanticoke is an unincorporated community and census-designated place in Wicomico County, Maryland, United States. It is part of the Salisbury, Maryland-Delaware Metropolitan Statistical Area.

Demographics

See also
Roaring Point

References

Census-designated places in Maryland
Census-designated places in Wicomico County, Maryland
Salisbury metropolitan area
Maryland populated places on the Chesapeake Bay